Beinn Bhreac (681 m) is a mountain in Argyll and Bute, Scotland. It is part of the Luss Hills, a southern subrange of the Grampian Mountains.

Rising from the western shore of Loch Lomond near the village of Tarbet, it takes the form of a rough ridge.

References

Mountains and hills of Argyll and Bute
Marilyns of Scotland
Grahams
Mountains and hills of the Southern Highlands